"Transistor" is the title track by the band 311 from the album Transistor (1997). The song clocks in at approximately 3:03. A music video was also shot and directed for the single.

Music video
The video features the band playing in a small room, while a giant CGI rotating orb travels from different locations showing the band performing in their room on the sides of the orb. Some of the places include a city sidewalk, forest, suburban neighborhood and the Griffith Observatory.

Charts

References

1997 singles
311 (band) songs
Songs written by Nick Hexum
Songs written by SA Martinez
1997 songs
Songs written by Chad Sexton
Capricorn Records singles